The Elks Lodge is a historic clubhouse at 500 Mena Street in Mena, Arkansas.  It is a two-story brick building, with a hip roof, marble trim, and a granite foundation.  Its Colonial Revival styling includes corner quoining, porches along the front and side with square supporting posts and diamond-pattern balcony balustrade above.  It was built in 1908 by the local chapter of the Elks fraternal organization, and has long been a local social venue.  Between 1935 and 1951 it housed the local hospital, after which it returned to the Elks.  It is also one of the community's finest examples of commercial Colonial Revival architecture.

The building was listed on the National Register of Historic Places in 1998.

See also
National Register of Historic Places listings in Polk County, Arkansas

References

Clubhouses on the National Register of Historic Places in Arkansas
Neoclassical architecture in Arkansas
Buildings and structures completed in 1908
Buildings and structures in Polk County, Arkansas
Elks buildings
National Register of Historic Places in Polk County, Arkansas
Historic district contributing properties in Arkansas
1908 establishments in Arkansas